A Lo Cubano is the debut album by Orishas, a Cuban hip hop group. It was originally released on October 3, 2000 on the Universal Latino label.

Track listing
"Intro" – 1:57
"Represent" – 3:57 (music video directed by J.G Biggs )
"Atrevido" – 4:02
"A Lo Cubano" – 4:03
"Barrio" – 3:54
"S.O.L.A.R." – 0:44
"1.9.9.9" – 4:10
"Atencion" – 4:49
"Mistica" – 4:25
"Canto Para Elewa Y Chango" – 4:36
"Madre" – 4:06
"Orishas Llego" – 4:14
"537 C.U.B.A." – 4:23
"Connexion" – 4:16
"Triunfo" – 3:48

Charts

Weekly charts

Certifications

References

Orishas (band) albums
2000 debut albums